Wu Yuhua  is a Chinese football midfielder who played for China in the 1984 Asian Cup. He also played for Guangdong.

Career statistics

International statistics

External links
Team China Stats
Player profile at Sodasoccer.com

Chinese footballers
1960 births
Living people
Association football midfielders
Footballers from Guangzhou
China international footballers